Glenfaba & Peel is a House of Keys constituency in the west of the Isle of Man. It was created for the 2016 general election and elects 2 MHKs; currently Kate Lord-Brennan and Tim Crookall.

Elections

References

Constituencies of the Isle of Man
Constituencies established in 2016
2016 establishments in the Isle of Man
Peel, Isle of Man